W.T. Chan Fellowships Program (Chinese: 陈荣捷奖学金项目), also known as the Lingnan Chan Fellowships Program, is a six-month program established by the Lingnan Foundation in 2001 to commemorate Wing-Tsit Chan, former Dean of Lingnan University and Distinguished Professor of Chinese Philosophy and Religion. Celebrating the Lingnan motto "Education for Service", the program provides challenging educational and leadership opportunities for Chinese Students through service learning and intercultural experiences in the United States. At its core, the program seeks to nurture a life-long commitment to service.

The Lingnan Foundation selects W.T. Chan Fellows on the basis of their commitment to service as well as their maturity, flexibility, experience, personal initiative, and creativity. Each selected Fellow is assigned to work at a non-profit organization in California. With support and guidance from program organizers, the Fellows gain practical experience in service work and inter-cultural cooperation. Fellows live in American homes for the full duration of the program. They also attend seminars on non-profit organization management and community development, cultural events, as well as mandatory weekly reflection meetings while in the United States. The program usually runs from August to January.

Eligibility 
Undergraduates and postgraduates from Sun Yat-sen University and Lingnan University (Hong Kong) (conditions apply).

Sun Yat-sen University:

All second-year or third-year undergraduate and first-year postgraduate students (excluding international students and students from Hong Kong or Macau) from all majors are eligible to apply.

Lingnan University (Hong Kong):

All second-year or third-year undergraduate and postgraduate students from all majors are eligible to apply.

Final year undergraduate and postgraduate students should provide proof of acceptance to graduate program for next academic year on or before May of the year. 

The number of Fellowships awarded each year ranges from eight to twelve.

Education sites 
University of California, Berkeley  Public Service Center

University of Southern California U.S.-China Institute

Possible internship sites 
Community Partners

Asian Pacific Women's Center

Institute for International Education (IIE)

The Museum of Children's Art

Center for Law in the Public Interest  (WLCAC)

Watts Labor Community Action Committee (WLCAC)

References

External links 
  
Scholarships in China